José Ivanaldo de Souza (born 6 June 1975 in Itajá), or simply Souza, is a Brazilian former footballer who played as an attacking midfielder.

Honours

Club
Rio Grande do Norte State League: 1991, 1992
Bandeirantes Cup: 1994
São Paulo State League: 1995, 2000, 2002
Brazilian Cup: 1995, 2006
Ramon de Carranza Trophy: 1996
Brazilian League: 2001
Tournament Rio – São Paulo: 2001
São Paulo State Superleague: 2002

International
Pre-Olympic Tournament: 1996

External links
 atletico.com.br 
 
 CBF  

1975 births
Living people
Brazilian footballers
Brazilian expatriate footballers
América Futebol Clube (RN) players
Rio Branco Esporte Clube players
Sport Club Corinthians Paulista players
São Paulo FC players
Clube Atlético Mineiro players
PFC Krylia Sovetov Samara players
CR Flamengo footballers
Expatriate footballers in Russia
Russian Premier League players
Association football midfielders
1996 CONCACAF Gold Cup players
Brazil international footballers